The 2014 Liga Nacional de Fútbol de Puerto Rico is 6th season Puerto Rico's top-division football league.

Standings

References 

Liga Nacional de Fútbol de Puerto Rico
1